The Nonsuch 40 is a Taiwanese sailboat, that was designed by Mark Ellis Design and first built in 1988.

The Nonsuch 40 is a development of the Nonsuch 30, which was the first design in the Nonsuch series of sailboats.

Production
The design was built by Sen Koh Shipbuilding in Taiwan, with the boats completed and fitted-out by Wiggers Custom Yachts in Canada. A total of 5 examples of the design were completed before production ended. The design was marketed as the Journeyman 40 in the United Kingdom and as the Sequioa 40 in Canada.

Design
The Nonsuch 40 is a small recreational keelboat, built predominantly of fiberglass. It has a cat rig, an unstayed mast with a wishbone boom, a plumb stem, a vertical transom, an internally-mounted spade-type rudder controlled by a wheel and a fixed fin keel. It displaces .

See also
List of sailing boat types

References

Keelboats
1980s sailboat type designs
Sailing yachts
Sailboat type designs by Mark Ellis
Sailboat types built by Sen Koh Shipbuilding
Sailboat types built by Wiggers Custom Yachts